Baugé-en-Anjou (literally Baugé in Anjou) is a commune in the Maine-et-Loire department in western France. This new commune was created on 1 January 2013 from the merger of five former communes, Baugé, Montpollin, Pontigné, Saint-Martin-d'Arcé and Le Vieil-Baugé, which became communes déléguées (lit. "delegated communes"). Its center is Baugé. On 1 January 2016, it was further expanded with the former communes Bocé, Chartrené, Cheviré-le-Rouge, Clefs-Val d'Anjou, Cuon, Échemiré, Fougeré, Le Guédeniau and Saint-Quentin-lès-Beaurepaire. Clefs-Val d'Anjou was the result of the merger, on 1 January 2013, of the former communes Clefs and Vaulandry.

Population

See also
Communes of the Maine-et-Loire department

References

Communes of Maine-et-Loire
Anjou